Yorky Stephanie Arriagada Bustos (born 31 May 1993) is a Chilean footballer who plays as a midfielder for Audax Italiano and the Chile women's national team.

International career
Arriagada has represented Chile at the 2010 FIFA U-17 Women's World Cup. At senior level, she played the 2011 Pan American Games, the 2013 International Women's Football Tournament of Brasília, the 2014 South American Games and the 2014 Copa América Femenina.

References

External links

1993 births
Living people
Women's association football midfielders
Chilean women's footballers
Chile women's international footballers
Pan American Games competitors for Chile
Footballers at the 2011 Pan American Games
South American Games silver medalists for Chile
South American Games medalists in football
Competitors at the 2014 South American Games
Santiago Morning footballers
Audax Italiano footballers